Sire is a form of address for reigning kings in the United Kingdom and in Belgium.

Sire may also refer to:
 Father, particularly in animal breeding, especially a horse
 James W. Sire (1933–2018), author on worldviews
 Sire (novel), a 1991 novel by Jean Raspail
 Sire Records, a record label
 Sire, Arsi, a town in southeastern Ethiopia
 Sire, Welega, a town in southwestern Ethiopia
 Sire (woreda), a district in Oromia Region, Ethiopia
 Sire, in the table-top RPG Vampire: The Masquerade, the vampiric creator of another vampire
 Sire Guitars, a company whose products include Marcus Miller signature bass guitars and Larry Carlton signature electric guitars

See also
Albio Sires, American politician
Sires' Produce Stakes (disambiguation), the name of several different horse races